Four Rooms is a British factual television show that aired on Channel 4/More4 from 24 May 2011 to 23 November 2019 and was originally hosted by Anita Rani from 2011 to 2015 and then Sarah Beeny from 2016 to 2019.

Format
Each episode sees members of the public attempt to sell their valuable and collectible items in exchange for a cash offer from one of the four dealers.

Episodes

Dealers
Key:
 Currently stars
 Previously starred

International versions
Three short-lived versions of Four Rooms were licensed internationally, none lasting more than one season:

 In the United States, six episodes titled Final Offer—subsequently retitled Four Rooms US when shown in the UK in 2013—aired from May 2012 to July 2012. 
A Canadian version ran on CBC-TV for eight episodes from January 2014 to March 2014.
 The German version called "Wer bietet mehr?" hosted by Kai Pflaume ran on public-legal channel Norddeutscher Rundfunk for only three episodes in 2016.
 The German version "Die Superhändler – 4 Räume, 1 Deal", started on 27 August 2018, on RTL Television and is hosted by Rag-and-bone man Sükrü Pehlivan. Over 500 episodes had aired by 2021.
The Dutch version "Van Onschatbare Waarde", started on 2 March 2017 on NPO 1 Omroep Max and was hosted by Dionne Stax. Four seasons so far as per September 2020.
The Flemish version "Stukken van Mensen", started in 2016 in Belgium on the commercial channel Vier. It is hosted by Evy Gruyaert.

References

External links
 
 

2011 British television series debuts
2019 British television series endings
Antiques television series
Channel 4 original programming
Television series by Fremantle (company)